Dysschema magdala is a moth of the family Erebidae. It was described by Jean Baptiste Boisduval in 1870. It is found in Guatemala, Costa Rica and Panama.

References

Dysschema
Moths described in 1870